Monte Rasu is a mountain in the Goceano's range, in  the province of Sassari, central west Sardinia, Italy. Its summit, called sa Punta Manna (1,259 m),  is the highest peak in the  province of Sassari.

The mount is surrounded by the woods of Foresta Burgos, Sos Niberos and Badde Salighes, characterized for the presence of thousand-year trees of holly and taxus baccata, and woods of downy oaks, chestnuts and holm oaks.

Rasu